A blockhouse is a small, isolated fort in the form of a single building.

Blockhouse or block house may also refer to:

Buildings
 Blockhouse (Central Park), fort in New York City
 Blockhouse on Signal Mountain (Oklahoma), historic building at Fort Sill, Oklahoma
 Block House (Delaware), historic building in Claymont, Delaware
 Block House (Governors Island), historic building on Governors Island, New York
 Block House (Melcombe), old fort in Weymouth, Dorset
 Fort Pitt Block House, historic building in Point State Park, Pittsburgh
 Blockhaus d'Éperlecques, a Nazi bunker in France, built as a V-2 launch base

Other
 Blockhouse, Nova Scotia
 Blockhouse, Washington
 Block House (restaurant), chain based in Hamburg
 The Blockhouse, 1973 film